Linnéa Solli Myhre (born 16 April 1990, in Molde) is a Norwegian author and blogger.

Her blog was among the country's most read with daily visits by over 30,000 unique readers. In 2011 she was named the best blogger of the year during the Vixen Blog Awards and Costume Awards.

On 29 November 2011, the website "La Linnéa Leve" started with Linnéa Myhre and Andreas Øverland on the NRK website. The series is about mental disorders and how Myhre has it with its depression despite prolonged psychological treatment.

Myhre released the novel Evig søndag in 2012. The book is defined as a novel, but is close to reality as it follows one year in Linnéa Myhre's life. During the year, she reluctantly began to go to psychiatrists for her depression, and Myhre's problems with eating disorder are central to the book. The first edition of 2,500 books were sold on launch day. For 2012, she received the Tabupris from the Council for Mental Health.

Myhre's second novel Kjære was released in October 2014. Her third book Hver gang du forlater meg came in 2016.

In autumn 2014, Myhre was a participant in the entertainment programme Skal vi danse? on TV 2.

Myhre is named Anne-Kat. Hærland's inheritance of Anne-Kat Hærland herself and has been named Norway's most sexy woman of the magazine Mann.

She is the daughter of journalist Arild Myhre.

Melodi Grand Prix Junior 2002
As part of the trio Mabelin, Myhre participated in the first edition of MGPjr in 2002 with "Det var en gang". The group came in ten and last place with ten points. "Det var en gang" participated in the Melodi Grand Prix Junior 2002 album lasting ten weeks on the VG-lista with a fourth place as the best location.

Bibliography

References

External links

 – Linnéa Myhre blog 
 on NRK P3 

1990 births
Norwegian bloggers
Norwegian women bloggers
People from Molde
Living people